Salem Amri (born November 28, 1948 in Ain El Hammam, Tizi Ouzou Province) is a retired Algerian football player that played as a striker.

Club career
 1966-1971 WA Rouiba 
 1972-1982 JS Kabylie

Honours
 Won the African Cup of Champions Clubs once with JS Kabylie in 1981
 Won the Algerian League four times with JS Kabylie in 1973, 1974, 1977 and 1980
 Won the Algerian Cup once with JS Kabylie in 1977

References

1948 births
Living people
People from Ain El Hammam
Kabyle people
Algerian footballers
JS Kabylie players
Association football forwards
21st-century Algerian people